Adja Yunkers (1900–1983) was an American abstract painter and printmaker. He was born in Riga, Governorate of Livonia, Russian Empire in 1900.  He studied art in Leningrad, Berlin, Paris, and London.  He lived in Paris for 14 years, and then moved to Stockholm in 1939. In Stockholm, he published and edited the arts magazines ARS magazine and Creation magazine. In 1947 he moved to the United States, where he lived for the rest of his life. He held a teaching position at the New School for Social Research in New York while summers were spent teaching at the University of New Mexico. In 1949, he received a Guggenheim Fellowship. During the 1950s he primarily worked in color woodcuts, introducing brushwork into the genre. In 1960, he began producing lithographs.  He produced two important series of lithographs at the Tamarind Lithography Workshop in Los Angeles―Salt (five lithographs) and Skies of Venice (ten lithographs).  Yunkers died in New York City in 1983.

Permanent collections
Bibliothèque Nationale, Paris
Boca Raton Museum of Art, Florida
Brooklyn Museum, New York City
Cleveland Museum of Art, Ohio
Corcoran Gallery, Washington, D.C.
Currier Museum of Art, Manchester, New Hampshire
Fine Arts Museums of San Francisco, California
Guggenheim Museum, New York
Hamburg Kunsthalle, Germany
Hirshhorn Museum and Sculpture Garden, Washington, D.C.
Honolulu Museum of Art, Hawaii
Indianapolis Museum of Art, Indiana
Museo Pedro Coronel, Zacatecas, México
Museum of Fine Arts, Boston, Massachusetts
Museum of Modern Art, New York City
National Gallery of Art, Washington, D.C.
Rijksmuseum, Amsterdam
Seattle Art Museum
Smart Museum of Art, University of Chicago, Illinois
Smithsonian American Art Museum, Washington, D.C.
Stockholm National Gallery, Sweden
Toledo Museum of Art, Ohio
University of South Florida Contemporary Art Museum
Utah Museum of Fine Arts, University of Utah, Salt Lake City
Victoria and Albert Museum, London
Whitney Museum of American Art, New York
 Museo de la Solidaridad Salvador Allende, Chile

References

Bartelik, Marek, To Invent a Garden, The Life and Art of Adja Yunkers, New York, Hudson Hills Press, 2000.
Johnson, Una E. & Jo Miller, Adja Yunkers; Prints 1927-1967, Brooklyn, N.Y., Brooklyn Museum, 1969.
Paz, Octavio, Blanco, Illuminations by Adja Yunkers, Yunkers, 1974.
University of New Mexico, New Mexico Artists: John Sloan, Ernest L. Blumenschein, Gustave Baumann, Kenneth M. Adams, Adja Yunkers, Raymond Jonson, Peter Hurd, Howard Cook, Albuquerque, N.M., University of New Mexico Press, 1952.
Utah Museum of Fine Arts, Adja Yunkers, Salt Lake City, Utah Museum of Fine Arts, 1969.
Yunkers, Adja, Adja Yunkers, Amsterdam, Stedelijk Museaum, 1962.

External links

Adja Yunkers in ArtCyclopedia

1900 births
1983 deaths
20th-century American painters
American male painters
Abstract expressionist artists
Modern painters
Latvian artists
Artists from Riga
The New School faculty
University of New Mexico faculty
20th-century American printmakers
20th-century American male artists